Vaalii Faalogo is a Samoan footballer who plays as a defender.

References

External links
 

Living people
1983 births
Samoan footballers
Samoa international footballers
Association football defenders
2012 OFC Nations Cup players